Nosibe is a town and commune in northern Madagascar. It belongs to the district of Vohemar, which is a part of Sava Region. The population of the commune was estimated to be approximately 9,000 in 2001 commune census.

Only primary schooling is available. The majority 85% of the population of the commune are farmers, while an additional 14% receives their livelihood from raising livestock. The most important crop is rice, while other important products are bananas, sugarcane and maize.  Services provide employment for 0.5% of the population. Additionally fishing employs 0.5% of the population.

References and notes 

Populated places in Sava Region